Vulmara is a monotypic moth genus in the subfamily Arctiinae described by William Schaus in 1924. Its single species, Vulmara drostana, described by the same author in the same year, is found in Guatemala.

References

Lithosiini